María del Carmen Aquino Merchan is an Ecuadorian National Assembly member who is an Independent.

Life
In 2014 she was a councillor for the canton where she was born in 1988.

She worked at the Santa Elena Peninsula State University as a Professor and at one time was the General Manager of the Santa Elena Municipal Public Tourism Company.

She was elected to the Ecuadorian National Assembly in 2021 for the Province of Santa Elena. Her substitute was Rivet Moreno Simón Bolívar. She became a member of the Assembly's "Permanent Commission on Sovereignty, Integration and Integral Security" and its vice-president.

In 2022 she was an independent assembly member who had in the past been a member of the PSC party. She was aligned with the "Bank of the National Agreement" group, but her, and seven others, loyalty was questioned as that group was in decline. The seven others included other independents like Vanessa Freire.

References

Living people
1988 births
21st-century Ecuadorian women politicians
21st-century Ecuadorian politicians